Jean Liébault (1535 – 21 June 1596) was a doctor and agronomist, born in Dijon.

He married Nicole Estienne, who published several writings about marriage, in which she condemned domestic violence and a large age difference between spouses. His father-in-law was Charles Estienne, author of the Praedieum rusticum. Liébault substantially altered and extended Estienne's book, resulting in a French text La Maison Rustique (translated into English by Richard Surflet as "The Countrey Farme" in 1616). He translated or authored the medical textbook Trois Livres appartenans aux infirmitez et maladies des femmes.

Bibliography
 Louis-Gabriel Michaud, Biographie universelle ancienne et moderne : histoire par ordre alphabétique de la vie publique et privée de tous les hommes avec la collaboration de plus de 300 savants et littérateurs français ou étrangers, 2e édition, 1843-1865 [détail édition]
 Antonio Saltini, Storia delle scienze agrarie, t.I Dalle origini al Rinascimento, Edagricole, Bologna 1984, pp. 257–269

References

1596 deaths
1535 births
16th-century French physicians
French agronomists
Physicians from Dijon
16th-century Latin-language writers